Lawrence W. Overton (born c. 1848) was a state legislator in Mississippi. He was born in Kentucky. He represented Noxubee County in the Mississippi House of Representatives in 1876. Hampton L. Jarnagin and Marshall McNeese were his fellow representatives from Noxubee County.
He married Izella Richmond with whom he had three children.

See also
African-American officeholders during and following the Reconstruction era

References

1840s births
Year of birth uncertain
Year of death missing
Members of the Mississippi House of Representatives
People from Noxubee County, Mississippi
African-American politicians during the Reconstruction Era